An equatorial platform or equatorial table is an equatorial telescope mount in the form of a specially designed platform that allows any device sitting on it to track astronomical objects in the sky on an equatorial axis. They are used to give equatorial tracking to any device sitting on them, from small cameras up to entire observatory buildings. They are often used with altazimuth mounted telescopes, such as the common Dobsonian telescope type, to overcome that type of mount's inability to track the night sky. With careful polar alignment sub-arc second precision CCD imaging is entirely possible. Roeser Observatory, Luxembourg (MPC observatory code 163) have contributed hundreds of astrometric measurements of Near Earth Asteroids to the Minor Planet Center using a home-built 20" Dobsonian telescope on an Osypowski equatorial platform.

Types
Many types of equatorial platform have been used over the years. The mid-1960s saw the introduction of the Russian AFU-75 satellite-tracking camera  which consisted of a 3-axis altitude-altitude-azimuth mount mounted on a three-point equatorial platform. Two of the points were aligned on a polar axis while the third was a jackscrew actuator to drive the platform. This gave the mount a few minutes of equatorial tracking to allow stars in the field of view to be imaged as points for accurate measurement.

The late 1970s saw the publication of Adrien Poncet's "Poncet Platform", a very simple design for amateur telescope makers that used a pivot point and an inclined plane that made a very low profile "table". This type of mount has been a popular retrofit for altazimuth mounted telescopes, such as the common Dobsonian telescope type, adding equatorial tracking for high magnification work and astrophotography.

Since the Poncet Platform's simple bearing surfaces suffer from high mechanical loadings when used with heavy telescopes or at low geographic latitudes more sophisticated equatorial platform designs were invented in the 1980s. One was Alan Gee's design that uses a cylindrical bearing surface and a pivot making a mount similar in structure to a horseshoe mount that has been "cut flat". In 1988 Georges D'Autume proposed a more sophisticated design which used conical bearing surfaces all around to raise the height of the "virtual polar axis" to make the mount better balanced for heavier loads.

Poncet-based platforms are usually designed to track for 1 hour (15° of tilt) since longer tracking exceeds their range of motion, and could cause the instrument on top to topple off. At the end of its drive limit, the mount has to be pivoted back to the east to reset the clock drive mechanism.

Further reading
 Amateur telescope making - Stephen F. Tonkin - 1999, Chapter 9 Equatorial Platforms

See also
List of telescope parts and construction
List of telescope types

References

Telescopes